Amy is an unincorporated community in Ouachita County, Arkansas, United States.

References

Unincorporated communities in Ouachita County, Arkansas
Unincorporated communities in Arkansas